Anna Mary Healy, Baroness Healy of Primrose Hill (born 10 May 1955) is a British Labour politician and member of the House of Lords.

She graduated with a BA in Modern History & Politics from Royal Holloway College in 1976 and has worked for the Labour Party since 1978. She was special adviser to Harriet Harman when Leader of the Commons and John Prescott as Deputy Prime Minister. She worked in the Cabinet Office under Tony Blair's premiership and was then Senior Parliamentary Press Officer for the Labour Party for six years. During Harman's 2010 tenure as interim Leader of the Labour Party, she served as her chief of staff.  She has also worked for Jack Cunningham, Mo Mowlam, and The Lord Macdonald of Tradeston.

She was created a life peer in the 2010 Dissolution Honours, taking the title Baroness Healy of Primrose Hill, of Primrose Hill in the London Borough of Camden, on 19 July 2010. She sits on the  Lords Committee on HIV and AIDS.

Healy married Jon Cruddas, Labour MP, in 1992. They have one child, a son, Emmett.

References

External links
Baroness Healy of Primrose Hill

1955 births
Living people
Labour Party (UK) life peers
Life peeresses created by Elizabeth II
Labour Party (UK) officials
Alumni of Royal Holloway, University of London